Ameles africana is a species of praying mantis that inhabits Algeria, Morocco, Corsica, Dalmatia, Sardinia, Sicily, and Portugal.

See also
List of mantis genera and species

References

africana
Mantodea of Africa
Mantodea of Europe
Insects of North Africa
Fauna of Sardinia
Fauna of Sicily
Insects described in 1914